HeroEngine is a 3D game engine and server technology platform originally developed by Simutronics Corporation specifically for building MMO-style games. At first developed for the company's own game Hero's Journey, the engine won multiple awards at tradeshows, and has since been licensed by other companies such as BioWare Austin (which used it for Star Wars: The Old Republic).

On 12 June 2010, Idea Fabrik announced that it had purchased the HeroEngine, as well as hired staff that was associated with its development and support.

Features
The engine has online creation. For example, one developer can be creating a house and the entities inside, while another works on the landscaping and terrain around it. Each sees the other's work in real time.

The simulation and rendering processes of the engine are currently run on a single-thread. However, it is planned for there to be a multi-threaded release, but the publish date has not yet been determined.

Development times vary between games.  Faxion Online took 18 months to complete, and Star Wars: The Old Republic took over five years.

Integration with other technologies
HeroBlade contains integrated features such as custom scripting and collaborative project management, which allow developers to make notes directly onto the in-game levels for others to see. These notes can be attached to tasks to signal other developers that something specific needs to be worked on. HeroEngine also works with technology from third-party vendors, such as FMOD, PhysX, SpeedTree, Wwise, Scaleform, and Vivox, as well as having plugins for 3D Studio Max and Maya.

HeroCloud
HeroCloud is a version of HeroEngine that is available for $99 per year, under the license that they receive 30% the money sales of any game made with it.  It includes everything that a license to the HeroEngine has, except for access to the source code.

Awards
 Finalist for "Best Engine" from Game Developer magazine in 2006.

Funding Issues
The company chairman of Idea Fabrik announced on 6 November 2015 that they were having funding issues related to an unnamed 3rd party, which could cause downtime on their HeroEngine and HeroCloud services. He stated that they were attempting to resolve and were "currently in negotiations to secure [their] funding for the present and the future."

Games developed using HeroEngine

 Star Wars: The Old Republic (2011) - BioWare
 The Elder Scrolls Online (used for development)

References

External links
 HeroEngine Website

Video game engines